Palmeira dos Índios is a municipality located in the western of the Brazilian state of Alagoas.  , it has a population of around 70,000.

The city is situated in the interior of Alagoas. The Brazilian writer Graciliano Ramos was its mayor in 1927. It is the seat of the Roman Catholic Diocese of Palmeira dos Índios.

Languages
Xukuru-Kariri was spoken in Palmeira dos Índios.

Climate

See also
Fernando Iório Rodrigues

References

Municipalities in Alagoas